Joe Westerman (born 15 November 1989) is an English rugby league footballer who plays as a  or  for the Castleford Tigers in the Betfred Super League and the England Knights and England at international level.

He previously played for the Castleford Tigers (Heritage № 869), Hull F.C. in two separate spells and the Warrington Wolves in the Super League, and the Toronto Wolfpack in the Betfred Championship.

Background
Westerman was born in Pontefract, West Yorkshire, England.

Club career

Castleford Tigers
Westerman burst onto the scene in 2007 in the Castleford Tigers National League One campaign after signing from junior club the Featherstone Lions. Joe played in most of the Castleford Tiger's games and scored 2 tries in the National League One Grand Final at Headingley. Joe was named National League One young player of the year.

In 2008 Joe had a great first season in the Super League for Castleford scoring 12 tries in 25 games. He was tipped for being a future England RL international.

Hull F.C.
Westerman was Hull F.C.’s marquee signing for Super League XVI, with the Black and Whites paying one of their highest ever transfer fees to secure the services of the former Castleford Tigers man.

Warrington Wolves
In October 2015, Westerman signed a 3-year contract with Warrington for a fee of £150,000.

He played in the 2016 Challenge Cup Final defeat by Hull F.C. at Wembley Stadium.

He played in the 2016 Super League Grand Final defeat by the Wigan Warriors at Old Trafford.

Toronto Wolfpack
Upon promotion from League 1 in 2017, Westerman signed with Rugby League's first trans-Atlantic team, the Toronto Wolfpack, on 1 October 2017. Westerman joined fellow Wolves teammate Ashton Sims for the 2018 season, who signed with the Wolfpack less than a month prior. 

In April 2018 Westerman was released by Toronto Wolfpack after making only 4 appearances for the club. The decision to allow Westerman to leave for free raised eyebrows given he was less than 6 months into a 3 year contract and the Wolfpack had paid a transfer fee of £130,000 to secure his services.

Return to Hull F.C.
Westerman returned to Hull FC in April 2018 despite interest from other clubs. He cited coach Lee Radford and his love for Hull FC as reasons for his choice.

In the local derby in June 2019 against Hull Kingston Rovers, he dislocated his knee in a tackle only to slap it back in place and continue playing.

Wakefield Trinity
Westerman signed a two-year deal with Wakefield Trinity ahead of the 2020 Super League season.

Return to Castleford Tigers 
In June 2021, it was announced that Westerman would return to his boyhood club, the Castleford Tigers, on a two-year deal from the 2022 season. He would be working alongside former coach Lee Radford once again, as well as playing for the team he supported as a child. Commenting on the news, he said, "The standard is really high now and I just want to get there and play well for my hometown club next year."

Westerman made his second Castleford debut on 11 February 2022 against the Salford Red Devils. He was voted the Fans' Man of the Match for the first 2 rounds of the season against Salford and Warrington. Following another 2 Man of the Match performances against Wigan and Leeds in March, head coach Radford called Westerman "the best 13 in the competition".

International career 
Westerman played for and captained the England Knights in their 38-18 victory against France at the Leigh Sports Village on 15 October 2011.

Westerman made his senior international debut on 25 October 2014, starting in England's 32-26 victory against Samoa at the Suncorp Stadium in the 2014 Four Nations.

Westerman made a return to the England team on 25 June 2021, playing against the Combined Nations All Stars at the Halliwell Jones Stadium.

Personal life

Sex scandal
In February 2023, Castleford Tigers gave Westerman a "substantial fine" after an online video was released showing him performing a sex act in public on a woman, who was not his wife. The club also ordered Westerman to help educate young people on the effects of alcohol and "dangers of social media when in the public eye". Westerman issued a statement, saying "I'd also like to apologise to the supporters, sponsors, staff, and directors of Castleford Tigers as well as my team-mates. I'd like to extend this apology to the game of rugby league, and I have realised that I need to work on my decision-making around alcohol."

References

External links
Hull FC profile
SL profile
Toronto Wolfpack profile
(archived by web.archive.org) Castleford Tigers profile

1989 births
Living people
Castleford Tigers players
England Knights national rugby league team players
England national rugby league team players
English rugby league players
Hull F.C. players
Rugby league five-eighths
Rugby league locks
Rugby league players from Pontefract
Rugby league second-rows
Toronto Wolfpack players
Wakefield Trinity players
Warrington Wolves players